Icaridion is a genus of kelp fly in the family Coelopidae.

Species
Icaridion debile (Lamb, 1909)
Icaridion nasutum Lamb, 1909
Icaridion nigrifrons (Lamb, 1909)

References

Coelopidae
Sciomyzoidea genera